Adam Choice (born November 30, 1995) is an American football running back who is a free agent. He played college football at Clemson.

Early years
Choice attended Thomas County Central High School in Thomasville, Georgia. During his high school career he had over 5,000 rushing yards playing at the quarterback position. He committed to the Clemson to play college football at the running back position.

College career
As a true freshman at Clemson in 2014, Choice played in six games, rushing for 218 yards on 50 carries. However, on October 18, 2014 Choice suffered a season ending torn ACL at Boston College. Choice was redshirted the following year. Choice returned as a reserve running back for the 2016-2018 seasons finishing his college career with 1,250 rushing yards on 239 carries and 14 touchdowns. Choice earned a master's degree in human resource development.

Professional career
Choice was signed as an undrafted free agent by the Seattle Seahawks on May 3, 2019. He was waived/injured on May 29, 2019 and placed on injured reserve. He was waived on May 4, 2020.

Personal life
Choice is the cousin of former NFL running backs Tashard Choice and Joe Burns.

References

External links
Clemson Tigers bio

1995 births
Living people
American football running backs
Clemson Tigers football players
People from Thomasville, Georgia
Players of American football from Georgia (U.S. state)
Seattle Seahawks players